The Klang Royal Town Mosque is a mosque in Klang, Selangor, Malaysia. The mosque is located at Jalan Pasar on the banks of the Klang River giving the image of a floating mosque.

History
The mosque was built on the site of a smaller mosque known as "Masjid Klang Utara (Northern Klang Mosque). In 2003, the new mosque was started to be constructed due to bigger crowd faced by nearby mosques, Masjid India and Sultan Sulaiman Mosque. The current mosque was completed in 2009 and was officially opened by Sultan Sharafuddin Idris Shah on 11 December 2009 in conjunction with his birthday celebration.

Facilities
The mosque is equipped with facilities such as the main prayer hall, offices, lecture rooms, outdoor prayer halls, funeral management rooms and catering rooms.

See also
 Islam in Malaysia

References

External links

Official Facebook Page

Mosques in Selangor
Mosques completed in 2009
21st-century mosques
Mosque buildings with domes